Sean Murray is a Gaelic footballer who plays for the St Brigid's club and for the Dublin county team. He won the Leinster Senior Football Championship and the All-Ireland Senior Football Championship in 2011 as a squad member with Dublin. He won the 2011 Dublin Senior Football Championship with his club St Brigid's.

References

Living people
Dublin inter-county Gaelic footballers
St Brigid's (Dublin) Gaelic footballers
Year of birth missing (living people)